The Bay State Automobile Company was a Brass Era automobile manufacturer based in Boston, Massachusetts. It was founded by Rossell Drisko and Frederick E. Randall in 1906, and lasted to 1908.

It produced a touring car, the Bay State Forty.

References

Vehicle manufacturing companies established in 1906
Vehicle manufacturing companies disestablished in 1908
1906 establishments in Massachusetts
1908 disestablishments in Massachusetts
Defunct manufacturing companies based in Massachusetts